Gallo-Roman Museum may refer to:

Gallo-Roman Museum, Lyon in Lyon, France
Gallo-Roman Museum, Tongeren in Tongeren, Belgium

See also
Gallo-Roman culture